SOHAR Port and Freezone is a deep-sea port and adjacent free zone in the Middle East, located in Sohar, Sultanate of Oman, midway between Dubai and Muscat. With current investments exceeding $26 billion, it is one of the world's fastest growing port and free zone developments and lies at the centre of global trade routes between Europe and Asia.

The Freezone is a 4,500 - hectare development that, together with the Port, has attracted global investments of over US$26 billion.

The Port handles over one million tonnes of sea cargo each week and around 3,500 ships a year; it is equipped with deep-water jetties capable of handling the world's largest vessels, the Valemax class of dry bulk carriers.

Geography

The town of Sohar lies in the centre of the Al Batinah Region, in the North of Oman. This provides SOHAR Port with a strategic location outside the Strait of Hormuz  - the only stretch of water between the Gulf and the Indian Ocean, and an important means of sea transportation linking the Gulf region to India, the rest of the Middle East, China and South East Asia, as well as Europe.

History

His Majesty Sultan Qaboos bin Said, set up a Ministerial Committee to develop the Port of Salalah (previously called Raysut) and establish a new Port in Sohar in 1995.

Informal advisory work began from 1998 to 2000 in close cooperation with the Ministry of Transport and Communication. Subsequently, the first phase of the port was developed by the Omani Government.

In 2002, the Government of Oman and the Port of Rotterdam signed an MoU to develop a concession agreement for SOHAR Port, in July 2002. The Royal Decree 80/2002 ratified the Concession Agreement of Sohar Port and was issued in August of the same year.

From 2003 onwards, the construction of the petrochemical complex, terminal and other utilities commenced. The first lease agreement between Sohar Industrial Port Company and Sohar Refinery was signed in the same year, followed by a similar agreement for the general cargo terminal with Steinweg.

In 2007 a concession agreement for SOHAR to develop a 4,500 ha free zone was signed, and SOHAR Freezone was established in 2010.

Administration

SOHAR Port and Freezone is managed by Sohar Industrial Port Company (SIPC), a 50:50 joint venture between the Port of Rotterdam and the Sultanate of Oman.

Industrial Clusters 
 
SOHAR Port and Freezone was originally planned around three key industrial clusters, namely logistics metals, and petrochemicals. The port has since added a fourth pillar with the launch of the SOHAR Food Cluster, complemented by the first dedicated agro bulk terminal in a region heavily dependent on food imports.

Logistics

The SOHAR Port South expansion is fundamental to Oman's national focus on growing the logistics and industry sectors as part of its ongoing economic diversification efforts. This expansion will aid the steady growth in aggregate cargo volumes and investments at the port by delivering additional cargo capacity and attracting more business to SOHAR.

Metals

The metals cluster at SOHAR has experienced rapid development over the years. SOHAR is equipped with deep-water jetties capable of handling the Valemax class of Very Large Ore Carriers, which are among the world's largest ships. Apart from aluminium and streel, SOHAR also hosts the largest rare earth metal plant of its kind, second only to China. The plant will manufacture antimony metal and trioxide, a precious mineral used as a flame retardant in a wide range of industries. A recent signing will also see the construction of additional ferrochrome furnaces that will increase production capacity.

Petrochemicals

SOHAR is home to Oman Oil Refineries and Petroleum Industries Company's (Orpic), whose refineries in Sohar and Muscat as well as their integrated Aromatics and Polypropylene Plants, provide fuel, petrochemicals, polymers and other petroleum products to the Sultanate and to the world. Apart from fuel products, the refinery also produces significant volumes of naphtha and propylene, which serve as feedstock for an adjoining aromatics and polypropylene plant.

Food

The Food Cluster at SOHAR includes a flourmill, a sugar refinery, a grain silo complex and an upcoming soya bean crushing facility.
The cluster is able to load and unload 600 tonnes of grain per hour.

SOHAR Port South Development
 
SOHAR Port is undergoing the Sohar Port South Development, which will add 250 hectares to the industrial port's current capacity of 2,000 hectares by January 2019. The first phase is underway with an increase of 50 hectares in area, and additional expansions planned in subsequent phases.

See also
 Port of Rotterdam

References

Transport in Oman
Ports and harbours of Oman